is a traditional sweet, low-alcohol or non-alcoholic Japanese drink made from fermented rice.  Amazake dates from the Kofun period, and it is mentioned in the Nihon Shoki. It is part of the family of traditional Japanese foods made using the koji mold , which also includes miso, soy sauce, and sake.

There are several recipes for amazake that have been used for hundreds of years. By a popular recipe, kōji is added to cooled whole grain rice causing enzymes to break down the carbohydrates into simpler unrefined sugars. As the mixture incubates, sweetness develops naturally. By another recipe, sake kasu is mixed with water and sugar is added.

Amazake can be used as a dessert, snack, natural sweetening agent, baby food, salad dressing or smoothie. One traditional amazake drink, prepared by combining amazake and water, heated to a simmer, and often topped with a pinch of finely grated ginger, was popular with street vendors, and it is still served at inns, teahouses, and at festivals. Many Shinto shrines and Buddhist temples provide or sell it in the New Year. In the 20th century, an instant version became available.

Amazake contains many nutrients, including vitamin B1, B2, B6, folic acid, dietary fiber, oligosaccharide, cysteine, arginine and glutamine. It is often considered a hangover cure in Japan. Outside Japan, it is often sold in Asian grocery stores during the winter months, and, all year round, in natural food stores in the U.S. and Europe, as a beverage and natural sweetener.

Similar beverages include the Chinese jiuniang and Korean gamju. In grape winemaking, must – sweet, thick, unfermented grape juice – is a similar product.

See also

Brown rice syrup 
Choujiu
Gamju – Korean equivalent of Amazake
Jiuniang – Chinese equivalent of Amazake
Must – similar product in winemaking
Rice milk
Rice pudding
Small beer
Sikhye

References

External links
 

Fermented drinks
Japanese drinks
Plant milk
Probiotic foods
Rice drinks
Rice wine
Sake
Sugar substitutes